Gateway station is a station on Pittsburgh Regional Transit's light rail network, located in Pittsburgh, Pennsylvania. Until October 30, 2009, it was the network's westernmost extent within downtown Pittsburgh. The Port Authority closed Gateway Center as part of construction work on the North Shore Connector project, and a new station opened in 2012 (though its name was truncated from "Gateway Center" to simply "Gateway"). The former station entrance was demolished and a new station was built. Gateway station and North Side station lie at the southern and northern ends of the Allegheny River Tunnel, respectively.

History
Gateway Center station was opened on 3 July 1985 as part of the new subway system that replaced the remaining downtown street running trolleys. Named for Gateway Center, the adjacent office complex, the station served the western portion of downtown. The stop also served major buildings such as One PPG Place and Fifth Avenue Place, the shopping and dining district at Market Square, and the historical and recreational hub of Point State Park.

Gateway Center closed on October 30, 2009 as part of the North Shore Connector project, and a newly constructed station (named Gateway) opened just north of the original station on March 25, 2012. The original outbound platform under Liberty Ave was left intact, but the inbound platform was demolished to make the curve onto Stanwix Street.

The station features a mural by artist Romare Bearden. Commissioned by Pittsburgh Regional Transit as part of the original station complex, the mural is now valued at $15 million. The Heinz Endowments has pledged $250,000 toward the costs of removal and refurbishment.  The mural was removed when the station was demolished, but was reinstalled in the new station. The original mural had one tile which had accidentally been placed upside-down, and the reinstallation of the mural faithfully reproduced this error.

See also
Gateway Center (Pittsburgh)
 Wabash Pittsburgh Terminal (former train station)

References

External links
 
 North Shore Connector - Gateway Station
 Gateway Station - North Shore Connector

Port Authority of Allegheny County stations
Railway stations in the United States opened in 1985
Railway stations located underground in Pennsylvania
Blue Line (Pittsburgh)
Red Line (Pittsburgh)
Silver Line (Pittsburgh)